Chaney Run is a  long 2nd order tributary to Big Sandy Creek in Fayette County, Pennsylvania.

Course
Chaney Run rises about 1 mile south of Summit, Pennsylvania, and then flows southeast to join Big Sandy Creek about 2.5 miles southwest of Mt. Washington.

Watershed
Chaney Run drains  of area, receives about 51.6 in/year of precipitation, has a wetness index of 314.82, and is about 96% forested.

See also
List of rivers of Pennsylvania

References

Rivers of Pennsylvania
Rivers of Fayette County, Pennsylvania